Thomas Armstrong (26 December 1885 – 13 June 1955) was an English-born Australian politician.

He was born in Durham, the son of miner Thomas Armstrong. He arrived in Australia around 1887 and attended school at Wickham, later joining a colliery firm as a junior clerk. On 2 December 1908 he married Anice Pepper, with whom he had three children. He was a Wickham alderman from 1917 to 1920, serving as mayor in 1919, and eventually rose to the position of general manager of his firm. From 1935 to 1955 he was a member of the New South Wales Legislative Council, first for the United Australia Party and then for the Liberal Party. Armstrong died in Newcastle in 1955.

References

1885 births
1955 deaths
United Australia Party members of the Parliament of New South Wales
Liberal Party of Australia members of the Parliament of New South Wales
Members of the New South Wales Legislative Council
20th-century Australian politicians
British emigrants to Australia